Naina is a 1973 Bollywood film directed by Kanak Mishra. The song 'Hone Lagi Hai Raat Jawan', rendered by Asha Bhosle, earned her the 5th Filmfare award. It was composed by Shankar-Jaikishan.

The movie has similarities with Daphne du Maurier's novel Rebecca and features Shashi Kapoor in a rare negative role as a high-born aristocrat. Moushumi Chatterjee plays his second wife, who is constantly being compared with his first (Rajshree).

Cast 
Shashi Kapoor - Ravi
Moushumi Chatterjee
Rehman
Padma Khanna
David Abraham Cheulkar

Soundtrack 

The music was composed by Shankar-Jaikishan and the lyrics were by Hasrat Jaipuri, Indeevar and Kaifi Azmi.

Awards and nominations 

 Nomination Filmfare Award for Best Male Playback Singer - Mohd. Rafi for the song "Humko To Jaan Se Pyari Hai"
 Filmfare Award for Best Female Playback Singer - Asha Bhosle for the song "Hone Lagi Hai Raat Jawan"

References

1973 films
1970s Hindi-language films
Films scored by Shankar–Jaikishan
Films directed by Kanak Mishra